Kim Dong-hyun (born September 17, 1998), also known mononymously as Donghyun, is a South Korean singer-songwriter and actor. He is known for his participation in the reality competition show Produce 101 Season 2. He later debuted as a part of the musical duo, MXM. He is a member of South Korean boy group AB6IX.

Early life 
Kim Dong-hyun was born on September 17, 1998, in Daejeon, South Korea. He has an older brother, an older sister, and an older fraternal twin brother, making him the youngest person in his family. Prior to appearing on Produce 101 Season 2, Kim has trained for eleven months. He was a trainee at JYP Entertainment before he passed Brand New Music's audition and joined them as a trainee on late 2016.

Kim was a student at Namdaejeon High School.

Career

2017–2018: Produce 101 and MXM 

In mid-2017, Kim participated in the Produce 101 Season 2, a reality competition show designed to form a temporary boy group consisting of 11 members chosen by the public from 101 contestants. He represented Brand New Music along with three other trainees. He was eventually eliminated from the show, finishing in 28th place overall on episode 10.

On July 12, 2017, Brand New Music announced that Kim and Lim Young-min, one of his agency mates who also joined Produce 101, would make their debut as a project duo and pre-released a debut single within the same month before releasing an extended play in late August. The project unit name is revealed to be MXM, which was an acronym for "Mix & Match". They released their debut single, Good Day on July 27 which included the title track and "I Just Do", a song that was co-produced by Kim. A few weeks later, on September 6, they released their debut EP, Unmix.

On March 15, 2018, he starred as a male lead in the music video for Lee Kang's song "In Vain (feat. Yang Da-il)". He also appeared as a cameo in Gree's music video for the song "Dangerous".

2019–present: AB6IX and solo activities 

In early 2019, Brand New Music announced that Kim along with his fellow Produce 101 trainees and an addition of one other trainee would join the lineup for the agency's new boy group named AB6IX. On May 22, the group debuted with their EP, B:Complete which included "Shining Stars", a song that was co-produced by Kim.

In early 2021, Kim starred as one of male lead in a web series called Fling at Convenience Store. He also sang the soundtrack for the series, which was co-produced by him. In April 2021, Kim was confirmed to be part of the cast for the SBS television series Let Me Be Your Knight. He will play the role of Woo Ga-on, the keyboardist and youngest member of LUNA.

Discography

Songs

Songwriting 
All song credits are adapted from the Korea Music Copyright Association's database, unless otherwise noted.

Filmography

Television series

Web series

Television shows

Radio shows

Music video

Notes

References 

1998 births
Living people
AB6IX members
People from Daejeon
South Korean television personalities
South Korean male idols
South Korean dance musicians
South Korean male singer-songwriters
South Korean record producers
Brand New Music artists
Produce 101 contestants
21st-century South Korean male singers
Japanese-language singers of South Korea